The 5th Reserve Division (5. Reserve-Division) was a unit of the German Army, in World War I.  The division was formed on mobilization of the German Army in August 1914. The division was disbanded in 1919 during the demobilization of the German Army after World War I.  The division was a reserve division of the III Reserve Corps and was raised in the Prussian Province of Brandenburg.

Combat chronicle

The 5th Reserve Division began the war on the Western Front.  It fought in the opening campaigns against the Belgian Army and the British Expeditionary Force, including the Battle of Mons, and participated in the Siege of Antwerp.  It was in the Yser region during the Race to the Sea.  In December 1914, the division was transferred to the Eastern Front.  In 1915, it fought in the Gorlice-Tarnów Offensive, including in the battle for Warsaw.  It remained on the Eastern Front, mainly in positional warfare along the Shchara River, throughout the rest of 1915, in 1916, and into 1917.  In April 1917, the division returned to the Western Front along the heights of the Meuse River.  It fought in the Second Battle of the Aisne, also known as the Third Battle of Champagne (and to the Germans, as the Double Battle on the Aisne and in the Champagne). In 1918, it fought in the German spring offensive.  In June, it fought the Americans in the Battle of Montdidier-Noyon and then again in August during the Somme Offensive.  Allied intelligence rated it a second class division in 1918, noting that "in the earlier years it was a very good division, but through losses and lack of reinforcements during 1918 considerably reduced its value."

Order of battle on mobilization

The order of battle of the 5th Reserve Division on mobilization was as follows:

9.Reserve-Infanterie-Brigade
Brandenburgisches Reserve-Infanterie-Regiment Nr. 8
Brandenburgisches Reserve-Infanterie-Regiment Nr. 48
10.Reserve-Infanterie-Brigade
Brandenburgisches Reserve-Infanterie-Regiment Nr. 12
Brandenburgisches Reserve-Infanterie-Regiment Nr. 52
Reserve-Jäger-Bataillon Nr. 3
Reserve-Dragoner-Regiment Nr. 2
Reserve-Feldartillerie-Regiment Nr. 5
4.Kompanie/Pionier-Bataillon von Rauch (1. Brandenburgisches) Nr. 3

Order of battle on April 9, 1918

The 5th Reserve Division was triangularized in June 1915. Over the course of the war, other changes took place, including the formation of the artillery and signals commands. The order of battle on April 9, 1918, was as follows:

9.Reserve-Infanterie-Brigade
Brandenburgisches Reserve-Infanterie-Regiment Nr. 8
Brandenburgisches Reserve-Infanterie-Regiment Nr. 12
Brandenburgisches Reserve-Infanterie-Regiment Nr. 48
5.Eskadron/Dragoner-Regiment von Bredow (1. Schlesisches) Nr. 4
Artillerie-Kommandeur 90
Reserve-Feldartillerie-Regiment Nr. 5
IV.Bataillon/Reserve-Fußartillerie-Regiment Nr. 17
Stab Pionier-Bataillon Nr. 305
2.Reserve-Kompanie/Pionier-Bataillon von Rauch (1. Brandenburgisches) Nr. 3
Minenwerfer-Kompanie Nr. 205
Divisions-Nachrichten-Kommandeur 405

References
 5. Reserve-Division (Chronik 1914/1918) - Der erste Weltkrieg
 Hermann Cron et al., Ruhmeshalle unserer alten Armee (Berlin, 1935)
 Hermann Cron, Geschichte des deutschen Heeres im Weltkriege 1914-1918 (Berlin, 1937)
 Günter Wegner, Stellenbesetzung der deutschen Heere 1815-1939. (Biblio Verlag, Osnabrück, 1993), Bd. 1
 Histories of Two Hundred and Fifty-One Divisions of the German Army which Participated in the War (1914-1918), compiled from records of Intelligence section of the General Staff, American Expeditionary Forces, at General Headquarters, Chaumont, France 1919 (1920)

Notes

Infantry divisions of Germany in World War I
Military units and formations established in 1914
Military units and formations disestablished in 1919
1914 establishments in Germany